Aluu Airlines was a planned Greenlandic virtual airline, that never operated. The airline expected to commence operating services initially to four destinations between Greenland, Iceland and Denmark. Aluu airlines closed in January 2018.

References

External links
 Official website

Airlines established in 2015
Airlines disestablished in 2018
Greenlandic brands
Companies based in Nuuk
2018 disestablishments in Greenland
Greenlandic companies established in 2015